This is a list of notable events in country music that took place in the year 1982.

Events
 October 30 — Hank Williams, Jr. has nine albums simultaneously on the Billboard Top Country Albums chart.
 December 8 — The death of Marty Robbins at age 57 stuns the country music world and leaves a huge void among fans. He is inducted into the Country Music Hall of Fame just weeks earlier.

No dates
 Drake-Chenault syndicates The History of Country Music, a 52-hour country music version of the radio syndicator's successful The History of Rock and Roll (which had three editions issued, the last in 1981). Produced in 1981 and early 1982 before syndicating to radio stations, the radio documentary was hosted by Ralph Emery. Like its rock and roll forebearer, the program featured artist interviews, outtakes from notable radio and television broadcasts; spotlights on notable artists, styles and trends, along with songs that helped illustrate the subject; and time sweeps of individual years through 1981, with a montage of the biggest and most noteworthy hits of each year played. The final hour, Hour 52, was a time sweep of all of the country No. 1 songs from 1944 to the then-present, or approximately 650 individual songs that had topped the Billboard country charts. The special was structured much like the Rock and Roll program, allowing radio programmers to air it as a one-time "marathon" special (such as over holiday weekends), in multiple parts over a period of time, or as one-hour weekly programs.

Top hits of the year

Singles released by American artists

Singles released by Canadian artists

Top new album releases

Other top albums
{| class="wikitable sortable"
|-
! US
! Album
! Artist
! Record Label
|-
| align="center"| 54
| After All These Years
| Tompall & the Glaser Brothers
| Elektra
|-
| align="center"| 29
| Ain't Got Nothin' to Lose
| Bobby Bare
| Columbia
|-
| align="center"| 37
| Amazing Grace
| Cristy Lane
| Liberty
|-
| align="center"| 53
| Back in the Country
| Roy Acuff
| Elektra
|-
| align="center"| 63
| Backslidin'''
| Joe Stampley
| Epic
|-
| align="center"| 34
| Best of Boxcar, Vol. 1| Boxcar Willie
| Main Street
|-
| align="center"| 62
| The Best of Willie Nelson| Willie Nelson
| RCA
|-
| align="center"| 39
| Biggest Hits| Mickey Gilley
| Epic
|-
| align="center"| 64
| Biggest Hits| Tammy Wynette
| Epic
|-
| align="center"| 64
| Bluegrass Spectacular| Osborne Brothers
| RCA
|-
| align="center"| 47
| Changes| Tanya Tucker
| Arista
|-
| align="center"| 62
| Charley Pride Live| Charley Pride
| RCA
|-
| align="center"| 35
| Conway's #1 Classics Volume Two| Conway Twitty
| Elektra
|-
| align="center"| 50
| A Country Christmas| Various Artists
| RCA
|-
| align="center"| 29
| The Elvis Medley| Elvis Presley
| RCA
|-
| align="center"| 52
| Family & Friends| Ricky Skaggs
| Rounder
|-
| align="center"| 39
| Gary Morris| Gary Morris
| Warner Bros.
|-
| align="center"| 40
| A Gatlin Family Christmas| Larry Gatlin and the Gatlin Brothers
| Columbia
|-
| align="center"| 41
| Givin' Herself Away| Gail Davies
| Warner Bros.
|-
| align="center"| 41
| Goin' Home for Christmas| Merle Haggard
| Epic
|-
| align="center"| 62
| Good Love & Heartbreak| Tammy Wynette
| Epic
|-
| align="center"| 49
| Greatest Hits| Moe Bandy
| Columbia
|-
| align="center"| 34
| Greatest Hits| Janie Fricke
| Columbia
|-
| align="center"| 43
| Greatest Hits| Charly McClain
| Epic
|-
| align="center"| 59
| He Set My Life to Music| Barbara Mandrell
| MCA
|-
| align="center"| 48
| Heartbreak| Rodney Lay and the Wild West
| Churchill
|-
| align="center"| 42
| Here's to Us| Cristy Lane
| Liberty
|-
| align="center"| 27
| Honkytonk Man (Soundtrack)| Various Artists
| Warner Bros.
|-
| align="center"| 29
| The Hottest Night of the Year| Anne Murray
| Capitol
|-
| align="center"| 63
| I Write It Down| Ed Bruce
| MCA
|-
| align="center"| 37
| I'm Goin' Hurtin| Joe Stampley
| Epic
|-
| align="center"| 38
| It's a Long Way to Daytona
| Mel Tillis
| Elektra
|-
| align="center"| 59
| Jack Grayson Sings
| Jack Grayson
| Joe-Wes
|-
| align="center"| 26
| Just Hooked on Country
| Albert Coleman's Atlanta Pops
| Epic
|-
| align="center"| 38
| Kieran Kane
| Kieran Kane
| Elektra
|-
| align="center"| 27
| Last Train to Heaven
| Boxcar Willie
| Main Street
|-
| align="center"| 59
| A Little More Razz
| Razzy Bailey
| RCA
|-
| align="center"| 67
| Live
| Tanya Tucker
| MCA
|-
| align="center"| 58
| Mel Tillis' Greatest Hits
| Mel Tillis
| Elektra
|-
| align="center"| 48
| Memories of Christmas
| Elvis Presley
| RCA
|-
| align="center"| 37
| Merle Haggard's Greatest Hits
| Merle Haggard
| MCA
|-
| align="center"| 45
| Night After Night
| Jacky Ward
| Asylum
|-
| align="center"| 56
| Oh Girl
| Con Hunley
| Warner Bros.
|-
| align="center"| 33
| Old Home Town
| Glen Campbell
| Atlantic America
|-
| align="center"| 54
| The Osmond Brothers
| The Osmond Brothers
| Elektra/Curb
|-
| align="center"| 41
| Pistol Packin' Mama
| Hoyt Axton
| Jeremiah
|-
| align="center"| 49
| The Roy Clark Show Live from Austin City Limits
| Roy Clark
| Churchill
|-
| align="center"| 31
| Soft Touch
| Tammy Wynette
| Epic
|-
| align="center"| 33
| Some Days It Rains All Night Long
| Terri Gibbs
| MCA
|-
| align="center"| 32
| Sounds Like Love
| Johnny Lee
| Full Moon
|-
| align="center"| 35
| Steve Wariner
| Steve Wariner
| RCA
|-
| align="center"| 38
| Stickin' Together
| The Kendalls
| Mercury
|-
| align="center"| 56
| Sugar Free
| Dave Rowland
| Elektra
|-
| align="center"| 43
| Take Me to the Country
| Mel McDaniel
| Capitol
|-
| align="center"| 67
| Talk to Me
| Cindy Hurt
| Churchill
|-
| align="center"| 27
| This Dream's on Me
| Gene Watson
| MCA
|-
| align="center"| 43
| Turned Loose
| Roy Clark
| Churchill
|-
| align="center"| 38
| Walk On
| Karen Brooks
| Warner Bros.
|-
| align="center"| 37
| When a Man Loves a Woman
| Jack Grayson
| Koala
|-
| align="center"| 44
| (You're My) Super Woman/(You're My) Incredible Man
| Louise Mandrell & R.C. Bannon
| RCA
|}

On television

Regular series
 Barbara Mandrell and the Mandrell Sisters (1980–1982, NBC)
 Hee Haw (1969–1993, syndicated)
 Pop! Goes the Country (1974–1982, syndicated)
 That Nashville Music (1970–1985, syndicated)

Specials

Births
 February 3 — Jessica Harp, member of The Wreckers.
 April 12 — Easton Corbin, singer of the early 2010s, with hits including "A Little More Country Than That"
 April 24 — Kelly Clarkson, pop singer who crossed over to country for hits including "Because of You" (duet with Reba McEntire) and "Don't You Wanna Stay" (duet with Jason Aldean); first winner of American Idol.
 May 31 — Casey James, third-place finalist on the ninth season of American Idol.
 July 5 — Dave Haywood, member of Lady Antebellum.
 August 28 — LeAnn Rimes, country pop superstar starting in the late 1990s (decade).
 December 16 — Frankie Ballard, country singer of the 2010s best known for "Helluva Life"

Deaths
 July 2 — DeFord Bailey, 82, harmonicaist and first African American performer on the Grand Ole Opry.
 October 27 — Hoyt Hawkins, 55, member of The Jordanaires.
 December 8 — Marty Robbins, 57, prolific, multi-styled artist for more than 30 years (heart failure).

Country Music Hall of Fame Inductees
Lefty Frizzell (1928–1975)
Roy Horton (1914–2003)
Marty Robbins (1925–1982)

Major awards

Grammy AwardsBest Female Country Vocal Performance — "Break It to Me Gently", Juice NewtonBest Male Country Vocal Performance — "Always on My Mind", Willie NelsonBest Country Performance by a Duo or Group with Vocal — "Mountain Music", AlabamaBest Country Instrumental Performance — "Alabama Jubilee," Roy ClarkBest Country Song — "Always on My Mind", Johnny Christopher, Wayne Carson Thompson and Mark James (Performer: Willie Nelson)

Juno AwardsCountry Male Vocalist of the Year — Ronnie HawkinsCountry Female Vocalist of the Year — Anne MurrayCountry Group or Duo of the Year — The Good Brothers

Academy of Country MusicEntertainer of the Year — AlabamaSong of the Year — "Are the Good Times Really Over (I Wish a Buck Was Still Silver)", Merle Haggard (Performer: Merle Haggard)Single of the Year — "Always on My Mind," Willie NelsonAlbum of the Year — Always on My Mind, Willie NelsonTop Male Vocalist — Ronnie MilsapTop Female Vocalist — SylviaTop Vocal Duo — Shelly West and David FrizzellTop Vocal Group — AlabamaTop New Male Vocalist — Michael Martin MurpheyTop New Female Vocalist — Karen Brooks

Canadian Country Music AssociationEntertainer of the Year — Family BrownMale Artist of the Year — Terry CarisseFemale Artist of the Year — Carroll BakerGroup of the Year — Family BrownSOCAN Song of the Year — "Some Never Stand a Chance", Family Brown (Performer: Family Brown)Single of the Year — "Some Never Stand a Chance", Family BrownAlbum of the Year — Raised on Country Music, Family BrownVista Rising Star Award — Ruth Ann

Country Music AssociationEntertainer of the Year — AlabamaSong of the Year — "Always on My Mind", Johnny Christopher, Wayne Carson Thompson and Mark James (Performer: Willie Nelson)Single of the Year — "Always on My Mind", Willie NelsonAlbum of the Year — Always on My Mind, Willie NelsonMale Vocalist of the Year — Ricky SkaggsFemale Vocalist of the Year — Janie FrickeVocal Duo of the Year — David Frizzell and Shelly WestVocal Group of the Year — AlabamaHorizon Award — Ricky SkaggsInstrumentalist of the Year — Chet AtkinsInstrumental Group of the Year''' — Alabama

Further reading
Kingsbury, Paul, "The Grand Ole Opry: History of Country Music. 70 Years of the Songs, the Stars and the Stories," Villard Books, Random House; Opryland USA, 1995
Kingsbury, Paul, "Vinyl Hayride: Country Music Album Covers 1947–1989," Country Music Foundation, 2003
Millard, Bob, "Country Music: 70 Years of America's Favorite Music," HarperCollins, New York, 1993
Whitburn, Joel, "Top Country Songs 1944–2005 – 6th Edition." 2005.

Other links
Country Music Association
Inductees of the Country Music Hall of Fame

References

External links
Country Music Hall of Fame

Country
Country music by year